Chena Ridge (Lower Tanana: Khotughee'oden) is a census-designated place (CDP) in Fairbanks North Star Borough, Alaska, United States. It is the location of the former city (1903-73) of Chena, now a ghost town that once rivaled nearby Fairbanks in importance. 

One of the new CDPs created in 2010 in Alaska, Chena Ridge is now a western suburb of Fairbanks, located between the George Parks Highway and the Tanana River.

As of the 2020 Census, the population was 6,015, up from 5,791 in 2010. Chena Ridge is the ninth-most populated CDP in Alaska.

Demographics 

Chena Ridge first appeared on the 2010 U.S. Census as a census-designated place (CDP). The population density was 158.8 people per square mile.

The racial makeup of the place was 74.8% White, 1.4% Black or African American, 10.6% Native American or Alaska Native, 1.1% Asian, 0.0%, Pacific Islander and 8.8% two or more races. In addition, 4.6% of the population identified as Hispanic or Latino.

References

Census-designated places in Fairbanks North Star Borough, Alaska
Ridges of Alaska